Rall is a surname. Notable people with the surname include:

David Rall (1926–1999), American environmental health scientist and administrator
Günther Rall (1918–2009), German military pilot 
Johann Rall (1726–1776), German officer of Hessian troops in the American revolutionary war
Ted Rall (born 1963), American cartoonist
Tommy Rall (1929–2020), American dancer
Wilfrid Rall, American neuroscientist
Yuri Rall (1890–1948), Soviet naval officer

See also
RAL (disambiguation)
Rallentando, a musical term meaning to slow the tempo of a piece of music